The King of the Ring tournament is a men's professional wrestling single-elimination tournament held periodically by WWE, a Connecticut-based professional wrestling promotion. Established in 1985, the winner of the inaugural tournament was Don Muraco. The prize for winning the tournament is being crowned the "King of the Ring"; some wrestlers have incorporated this into their character, such as adorning king's attire and acting and speaking with a regal attitude. Only one tournament awarded an additional reward, which was the 2002 tournament where winner Brock Lesnar received a match for the WWE Undisputed Championship. The tournament is also notable for beginning Stone Cold Steve Austin's rise to stardom after he won the 1996 tournament.

The tournament was established when the promotion was still called the World Wrestling Federation (WWF, renamed to WWE in 2002). It was held annually from 1985 to 2002, with the exception of 1990 and 1992. The tournaments from 1985 to 1989 and in 1991 were held as special non-televised house shows. A pay-per-view (PPV) event titled King of the Ring then began airing as the annual June PPV from 1993 until the final PPV in 2002; these titular PPVs featured the final few matches of that year's tournament as well as other matches not part of the tournament. After a four-year hiatus, the tournament returned in 2006 and has since been held periodically with the most recent occurring in 2021. These tournaments' matches aired across episodes of Raw and SmackDown with the finals occurring at a different PPV, such as Judgment Day for 2006, or on an episode of Raw. The semifinals and final of the 2015 tournament aired exclusively as a WWE Network event. The 2023 tournament will return the tournament to its own PPV and livestreaming event, rebranded as King and Queen of the Ring.

WWE introduced the brand extension in early 2002 and the tournament that year was held for wrestlers from both the Raw and SmackDown! brands. When the tournament returned in 2006, it was held exclusively for wrestlers from SmackDown!. The tournaments in 2008 and 2010 were held as interbrand tournaments, with the one in 2008 also featuring wrestlers from Raw and ECW, while the one in 2010 just featured those from Raw and SmackDown after ECW was disbanded earlier that same year. The 2015 tournament occurred when the brand split was not in effect. The brand split was reinstated in 2016, and tournaments held since have featured wrestlers from both Raw and SmackDown. A women's version called Queen's Crown was introduced alongside the 2021 King of the Ring tournament.

History

Early tournaments
The first King of the Ring tournament was held by the World Wrestling Federation (WWF) on July 8, 1985 at the Sullivan Stadium in Foxborough, Massachusetts. The inaugural tournament was won by Don Muraco, who defeated The Iron Sheik in the final. In addition to the tournament, there was only one other match during the night, in which Hulk Hogan defeated Nikolai Volkoff to retain the WWF World Heavyweight Championship. Further King of the Ring tournaments were held from 1986 to 1989 and in 1991. These early tournaments were held as special non-televised house shows in an effort to boost attendance at these events. The reward for winning the tournament was the title "King of the Ring," although 1986 winner Harley Race was the only one to carry this gimmick onto television during these early years of the tournament.

Pay-per-view

In 1993, the WWF began to produce an annual June pay-per-view (PPV) titled King of the Ring. The inaugural King of the Ring PPV took place on June 13, 1993, at the Nutter Center in Dayton, Ohio. Unlike the previous non-televised events, the PPV did not feature all of the tournament's matches. Instead, several of the qualifying matches preceded the event with the final few matches then taking place at the pay-per-view. There were also other matches that took place at the event as it was a traditional three-hour pay-per-view. The King of the Ring pay-per-view was considered one of the promotion's "Big Five" PPVs of the year, along with the Royal Rumble, WrestleMania, SummerSlam, and Survivor Series, up until its disestablishment after the 2002 event—the 2002 tournament was also the only tournament to award the winner a reward other than the title of "King of the Ring;" winner Brock Lesnar received a match for the WWE Undisputed Championship at that year's SummerSlam. Also in early 2002, the WWF was renamed to World Wrestling Entertainment (WWE) following a lawsuit from the World Wildlife Fund over the "WWF" initialism, and the promotion introduced the brand extension, in which the roster was divided between the Raw and SmackDown! brands where wrestlers were exclusively assigned to perform. The 2002 tournament was in turn held for wrestlers from both brands.

Revivals
After a four-year hiatus, the tournament returned in 2006 and was held exclusively for wrestlers from the SmackDown! brand. Unlike the previous years, however, there was not an associated pay-per-view. Instead, tournament matches took place across episodes of SmackDown!. The final of the 2006 tournament did occur at a PPV, but it was at Judgment Day where Booker T defeated Bobby Lashley in the tournament final. The tournament then returned in 2008, and was held as a special episode of Raw on April 21. This tournament was held for wrestlers from all three of WWE's brands at the time—Raw, SmackDown, and ECW, the latter of which was established as a third brand in 2006. The 2008 tournament was won by Raw's William Regal, who defeated ECW's CM Punk in the final. The 2010 tournament was then held in November that year. Qualifying matches occurred on the November 22 episode of Raw with the tournament itself being held on the November 29 episode. The 2010 tournament only featured wrestlers from Raw and SmackDown, as ECW had been disbanded in February that year. It was won by Raw's Sheamus, who defeated John Morrison, also from Raw, in the final. 

After a five-year hiatus, the tournament returned in 2015. Quarterfinal matches were held on the April 27 episode of Raw, with the semifinals and final airing the following night exclusively as an event on WWE's online streaming service, the WWE Network, which launched in February 2014. Bad News Barrett defeated Neville in the final. At this time, the brand split was not in effect as the brand extension had been dissolved in August 2011; also in April 2011, the promotion ceased using its full name with "WWE" becoming an orphaned initialism. After another four-year hiatus and after the brand extension had been reinstated in 2016, the tournament returned in 2019 and featured wrestlers from Raw and SmackDown. In this tournament, there was a Raw bracket and a SmackDown bracket and the winners of each faced off in the King of the Ring tournament final. Tournament matches began on the August 19 episode of Raw and were held across episodes of Raw and SmackDown over the next month. The final was originally scheduled to occur at that year's Clash of Champions event, but was rescheduled to occur on the following night's episode of Raw on September 16. The tournament was won by Raw's Baron Corbin, who defeated SmackDown's Chad Gable in the final.

The tournament returned in 2021 and was again between wrestlers from Raw and SmackDown. Like the 2019 tournament, there were two brackets, one for each brand. It began on the October 8 episode of SmackDown and continued across episodes of Raw and SmackDown, with the final held at the Crown Jewel event on October 21, 2021. Additionally, a women's version of the tournament was introduced, called Queen's Crown, and was held simultaneously alongside the men's tournament. Raw's Xavier Woods defeated SmackDown's Finn Bálor to win the 2021 tournament.

In March 2023, it was announced that the tournament would return to having its own PPV and livestreaming event, but rebranded as King and Queen of the Ring to also incorporate the Queen's Crown tournament. The event is scheduled to be held on May 27, 2023. The 2023 tournament will again feature wrestlers from both Raw and SmackDown.

King gimmicks
In 1986, the second King of the Ring winner, Harley Race, parlayed his victory into an arrogant King of Wrestling gimmick, featuring a regal cape and crown. This gimmick led to several notable feuds for Race with Junkyard Dog, Hulk Hogan, "Hacksaw" Jim Duggan, and others, even after new winners had been crowned in the annual tournament. In 1988, Race suffered an abdominal injury and during his absence, his manager Bobby "The Brain" Heenan awarded the crown to Haku in July, rechristening him King Haku, even though Randy Savage had won the tournament by that point and Ted DiBiase would also win the tournament during this storyline. Race eventually returned from his injury and briefly feuded with King Haku, but was unable to regain the crown at the 1989 Royal Rumble. King Haku then lost the crown to "Hacksaw" Jim Duggan in May 1989. "King Hacksaw" then lost it on August 30, 1989 to "Macho Man" Randy Savage, who rebranded himself "Macho King." Savage abandoned the "Macho King" gimmick upon his loss in a "Career ending match" to The Ultimate Warrior at WrestleMania VII in 1991, declaring afterwards that "the Kingdom of the Madness has been cracked in half." Following this, only wrestlers who had won the most recent tournament, as well as Jerry Lawler (who had used a King of Wrestling  image regionally in the Memphis area since the early 1970s) would use the gimmick up until 2021.

Owen Hart ("King of Harts"), Mabel ("King Mabel"), Kurt Angle ("King Kurt"), Edge ("King Edge the Awesome"), Booker T ("King Booker"), Sheamus ("King Sheamus"), Bad News Barrett ("King Barrett"), Baron Corbin ("King Corbin"), and Xavier Woods ("King Woods") are all wrestlers that also took on "King" nicknames after winning King of the Ring tournaments, with varying amounts of indulgence in their respective gimmick. William Regal won the tournament while serving as General Manager of Raw and began displaying King Lear signs of tyranny and delusion. Triple H alluded to his King of the Ring victory as part of his integrated gimmick starting in 2006 as the "King of Kings." In addition to the King's crown, various female wrestlers were portrayed as Queen while they were aligned with Kings, including "Queen of the Ring" The Fabulous Moolah (aligned with King Harley Race at WrestleMania III), Sensational Queen Sherri (manager of "Macho King" Randy Savage), and Queen Sharmell (manager of King Booker). Mo, Mabel's tag team partner in Men on a Mission, was "knighted" as Sir Mo by his partner after the latter's 1995 victory. Finlay and Regal were "knighted" as Sir Finlay and Sir Regal when they were part of King Booker's Court. In December 2020, King Corbin started a faction with Steve Cutler and Wesley Blake, knighting them as the "Knights of the Lone Wolf" (with lone wolf a reference to his previous nickname), although this would be short-lived as Cutler was released by WWE in February 2021. Corbin's king gimmick ended in June 2021 after he lost his King of the Ring crown in a match to Shinsuke Nakamura, who then took on a king persona, being called King Nakamura. On October 8, 2021, just prior to the start of the 2021 tournament that night, Nakamura respectfully relinquished the crown. After Xavier Woods won the 2021 tournament and became King Woods, he knighted his New Day tag team partner Kofi Kingston as "Sir Kofi Kingston", and appointed him the Hand of the King. After Woods took time off due to injury, his king gimmick was dropped upon his return.

List of winners

References